Jonathan Robert Rowan (born 29 November 1981) is an English former professional footballer who played as a forward from 2000 to 2010.

He started his professional career with Grimsby Town in the Football League, playing three years inside the second tier of English football and a further year in the third, the latter years of his Grimsby career were hit by a number of injuries which led to his departure in 2004. He briefly moved to Kidderminster Harriers before going on to join Kettering Town and Gainsborough Trinity. In 2006, he signed for Boston Town where his goal scoring rate earned him a move across town to Boston United. Rowan spent two seasons with United before returning to Boston Town in 2009. He retired from playing competitive football at the end of the 2009–10 season to concentrate on coaching within the sport.

He currently runs his own sports development firm called JR Sports which specialises in working with schools to improve sports access for children

Playing career

Grimsby Town
Rowan was added to the Mariners squad in the summer of 2000 by manager Alan Buckley, however following Buckley's dismissal it was his replacement Lennie Lawrence that handed Rowan his debut. He made that debut on 26 September 2000 when he came on as a 76th minute replacement for Daryl Clare in a League Cup 2nd round 1st leg match with Wolverhampton Wanderers and with what was his first touch of the ball he hit in Grimsby's third goal of the night which turned out to be the winning goal in a 3–2 win for The Mariners. Rowan featured in a further seven matches during the 2000–2001 season and by the time the next summer came around Rowan's performances in the club's pre-season tour of Scandinavia earned him the opportunity to start the new season as one of the club's favoured forwards. He straight away formed a forward partnership with Phil Jevons that saw the club rise briefly to the top of the First Division, he was also ever present and started in the historic 2–1 League Cup victory over Liverpool during the 2001–2002 season. However following injury problems, Rowan found himself mainly sidelined for the next couple of seasons, and when he was fit he often found himself only playing a cameo part in the first team affairs. This eventually led to his exit from Blundell Park following the conclusion of the 2003–2004 season. Whilst with Grimsby Rowan was considered capable of playing at the highest level, but ongoing injury problems at a relatively young age meant his time with the Mariners represented the peak of his footballing career.

Kidderminster Harriers
After leaving Grimsby he made a move to Football League Two side Kidderminster Harriers during the 2004–2005 season, however it was only for a brief spell where he signed on a non-contract basis. After making not one single appearance for the club, he was released in January 2005.

Kettering Town
Rowan joined Conference North side Kettering Town along with fellow former Grimsby teammate Steve Croudson. After playing in only a handful of games for the club who were briefly managed by Paul Gascoigne he moved on again.

Gainsborough Trinity
Rowan signed for fellow Conference North side Gainsborough Trinity during the 2005–2006 season however he initially struggled too break into the first team at Trinity and found himself playing second fiddle to other strikers at the club. He briefly left Gainsborough for a month, but returned and won his place back in the team and create a brief striking partnership with Dave Reeves and Clint Marcelle.

Boston Town
After a brief spell with Ossett Town in 2005, he joined Boston Town of the United Counties Football League who were 9 levels below the Football League Championship to which he had made his debut in for Grimsby only five years previously. At Boston he notched an impressive scoring rate. This enabled him to move back up the footballing pyramid the following season.

Boston United
In the summer of 2007 he transferred to cross town neighbours Boston United. The club had just suffered relegation from the Football League but due to financial irregularities at York Street the club were also demoted from the Conference National a few weeks later and had to start the 2007–2008 season playing in the Conference North. In his first season with United his performances earned him being voted the Player of the Season. Despite United finishing mid table more off the field complications saw the club demoted for a second time this time into the Northern Premier League. By the end of the 2008–2009 season The Pilgriims had failed to win promotion and the manager along with most of the playing squad departed that summer.

Return to Boston Town
Rowan returned to part-timers Boston Town for the 2009–2010 season. whilst also being contracted to former club Grimsby Town as a Community Coach, at the end of the season Rowan left Boston Town for a second time and opted to end his playing career to take up interests in coaching within the sport.

Coaching career
During the 2009–2010 season Rowan was appointed part-time Community Coach at former club Grimsby Town, he mixed his duties with playing as a semi-professional for Boston Town. Rowan was initially relieved of his duties in the summer of 2010 with the club only retaining former manager Graham Rodger as a Community coach, but this was short lived and he returned soon after on a part-time basis. In October 2010 Rowan launched his own sports business called JR Sports who work with schools to improve sport for their pupils.

Honours

Boston United
Supporters Player of the Year: 2008

Grimsby Town
Supporters Young Player of the Year: 2001

References

External links

electronicfishcake.com Player Profile

1981 births
Living people
Footballers from Grimsby
English footballers
Association football forwards
Kidderminster Harriers F.C. players
Grimsby Town F.C. players
Gainsborough Trinity F.C. players
Kettering Town F.C. players
Boston United F.C. players
Boston Town F.C. players
English Football League players
Grimsby Town F.C. non-playing staff
Ossett Town F.C. players